Newton is a Spanish band, famous for their song "Streamline". It was composed of the members J.J. Verdu and José Vicente Molla. Their style was mákina, an electronic music style very famous in Spain during the 1990s. The band also made music under pseudonyms, such as Carlton, Crazy Heaven, Edison or Omega.

Discography
1994 - "Streamline" 
1996 - "Wanna Dance All Day"
1997 - "Stretch"

References

External links
Newton (discogs.com)

Spanish electronic music groups